Bullmark is a locality situated in Umeå Municipality, Västerbotten County, Sweden with 319 inhabitants in 2010.

References

External links 
bullmark.se

Populated places in Umeå Municipality